Hypotia speciosalis is a species of snout moth in the genus Hypotia. It was described by Hugo Theodor Christoph in 1885 and is known from Turkmenistan.

References

Moths described in 1885
Hypotiini